Graham George Skidmore (22 September 1931 – 26 December 2021) was a British actor. He was best known for providing the voice-over for the British television dating gameshow Blind Date on ITV from 1985 until 2002, in which host Cilla Black referred to him as "Our Graham" and also for the BBC comedy panel game Shooting Stars.

Early life
Skidmore was born in West Bromwich in 1931, son of a Woolworths manager. He grew up in London and carried out his National Service in the Royal Army Medical Corps after leaving school. Skidmore had wanted to be a physician, but he missed his final exams due to an ear infection; he was also due to fight in the Korean War, but missed this for the same reason.

Career
In 1959, after taking singing lessons, Skidmore successfully auditioned for the musical Marigold at the Savoy Theatre in London. He could be seen in a background role in the 1960 film The Pure Hell of St Trinian's, and also played a minor role in the 1961 film The Day the Earth Caught Fire.

Skidmore was best known for being the voiceover on London Weekend Television's dating gameshow Blind Date from 1985 to 2002. Host Cilla Black referred to him as "our Graham". His identity was not publicly known at the time, although Skidmore's voice was recognised by Peter O'Toole. In 2002, Skidmore was sacked from Blind Date amid falling viewing numbers for the show; he was told of his sacking by letter and replaced by Tommy Sandhu.

Skidmore also had a similar role as a voiceover artist on the BBC comedy panel game Shooting Stars with Vic Reeves and Bob Mortimer, from 1993 to 2002, where he introduced the show's contestants.

He was a background character in the 1999 film Eyes Wide Shut, and appeared in person on The Justin Lee Collins Show in 2009. He found work as a photographic model and appeared on advertising posters as well as in television commercials, including as the 'Vaseline Hair Cream' man. He featured on posters for an "Unzip a banana" campaign, and with his family in adverts for P&O Travel and the Abbey National building society. He also did voiceovers in adverts for B&Q and Texas on British television.

Personal life and death
Skidmore married Pauline Mickleburgh in 1966. The marriage produced three children, one son and two daughters.

He attended the funeral of Blind Date host Cilla Black in 2015. He suffered from vascular malignancy and vascular dementia, which also affected his speech, during the last decade of his life and spent his final years living in Kent.

He died on 26 December 2021, aged 90, in Margate, but his death was not widely made known until it was reported by the entertainment union Equity in June 2022.

References

External links

Graham Skidmore at the British Film Institute
Graham Skidmore (Aveleyman)

1931 births
2021 deaths
English male voice actors
Deaths from dementia in England
Deaths from vascular dementia
Game show announcers
People from West Bromwich
Radio and television announcers
20th-century British male actors
21st-century British male actors